Operation Lentil (battle of the beans)  was an air raid by British carrier-based aircraft on oil installations at Pangkalan Brandan, an important centre for Indonesian oil production on Sumatra on 4 January 1945. It was part of the larger Operation Outflank, and its aim was to disrupt fuel supplies to Japanese forces in the Pacific.

Attacking force 
In terms of aircraft numbers, it was the Royal Navy's heaviest assault on the Japanese to date, with the three carriers embarking a total of 88 fighter planes.

Despite the lack of discipline from some of the fighter pilots, who abandoned their main mission of protecting the bombers to engage in dogfights with the enemy, the attack was pronounced a moderate success and gave way to follow-up attacks on Japanese oil production in Sumatra, under the codename Operation Meridian.

The attack was done under the command of then rear-admiral Philip Vian, who was in charge of the British Pacific Fleet's air operations. A high proportion of the pilots were New Zealanders.

Further reading 
 A detailed account of the operations of the Royal Navy in the Pacific in 1944–1945 was published in 1969 as "Task Force 57" by Peter C Smith. Republished by Crecy Publishing Manchester third edition 2001.  
 John Winton, The Forgotten Fleet:The British Navy in the Pacific 1944–1945, Coward McCann, 1970
 Jurgen Rohwer, Chronology of the War at Sea 1939–1945, Naval institute press, 2005,

External links
 Table of actions by Royal Navy
 New Zealand naval history
 HMS Ursa, Destroyer
 Operation Lentil : Operations of WW2

References 

Fleet Air Arm
World War II operations and battles of the Southeast Asia Theatre
World War II aerial operations and battles of the Pacific theatre
Aerial operations and battles of World War II involving the United Kingdom
Naval battles and operations of World War II involving the United Kingdom